Hans Waldemar Wessolowski (Graudenz, Germany August 19, 1893 – New York City 1947) was an artist best known for his many cover illustrations for early pulp magazines like Amazing Stories, Astounding Stories, 
Strange Tales  and Clues. His nickname in pulp world was "Wesso" and it is this name that is most commonly cited wherever his art is given credit.

According to Gail Thompson, the great niece of Wesso's wife, Minnie Ross Wessolowski, Hans Wesso came to America in June 1914 in New Orleans, where he jumped ship and swam to shore.

Works
The following is a partial list of his published artwork, according to William Contento's website 'The FictionMags Index' and the French website 'Noosfere':
 interior artwork in Clues 1928 July #1, #2, August #1, #2, October #1 and 2, December #1
 interior artwork in Clues 1929 January #2,
 interior artwork in Clues 1930 April #1, May #1 and #2, June #2, July #2
 interior artwork in Clues August 1934
 interior artwork in Clues 1937 May, June, July August, October
 cover for Air Adventures Oct 1928
 cover for The Danger Trail Oct 1928
 cover for Air Adventures Nov 1928
 cover for The Danger Trail Nov 1928
 cover for Adventure Trails 1929 January, February, April
 cover for Amazing Stories 1929 September, October, November, December
 cover for Wide World Adventures Sept 1929
 cover for Clues Nov #2 1929
 cover for Wide World Adventures May 1930
 cover for Clues 1931 June, November, December
 covers for all 7 consecutive issues of Strange Tales from September 1931 to January 1933
 cover for Clues 1932 April
 cover for Amazing Stories Aug 1930
 covers for the first 34 consecutive issues of Astounding Magazine from Jan 1930 to March 1933
 cover for Astounding Stories 1937 September, November
 cover for Astounding Stories 1938 Jan, March, June, August

Notes

External links
 

1893 births
1947 deaths
Analog Science Fiction and Fact people
German illustrators
People from Grudziądz
People from West Prussia
Science fiction artists
Pulp fiction artists
German emigrants to the United States